Don't Eat This Book: Fast Food and the Supersizing of America (usually shortened to Don't Eat This Book) is a 2005 book by Morgan Spurlock.

Content
Spurlock is known for his work in the documentary Super Size Me, and the book is a follow up to the film. It starts off with some statistics on American spending habits and explanations, for example of the warning label. It concentrates on American eating habits, with references to the film. It also talks briefly about how McDonald's started, and how its CEOs attempt to carry on Ray Kroc's legacy.

Publisher information
Spurlock MV (2005). Don't Eat This Book: Fast Food and the Supersizing of America. New York: Putnam.

Notes

Popular culture books
2005 non-fiction books